Randy D. Lemm is an American politician and farmer serving as a member of the North Dakota Senate from the 20th district. Elected in November 2018, he assumed office in January 2019.

Education 
Lemm earned a Bachelor of Science degree in animal science from North Dakota State University.

Career 
Prior to entering politics, Lemm worked for the North Dakota Farm Bureau. He was elected to the North Dakota Senate in November 2018 and assumed office in January 2019. Lemm has served as chair of the interim Senate Agriculture and Natural Resources Committee. He is also a member of the Veterinary Medical Education Program Admissions Committee.

References 

Living people
North Dakota State University alumni
Republican Party North Dakota state senators
People from Traill County, North Dakota
Year of birth missing (living people)